No Lies is a 1973 American short dramatic film made by Mitchell Block while he was a student at New York University.

Summary
The film, which is in the style of a cinéma vérité interview by a young filmmaker, deals with a young woman who has been raped and the trauma that came with it.

Legacy
In 2008, No Lies... was selected for inclusion by the United States Library of Congress to its National Film Registry, being deemed "culturally, historically, or aesthetically significant."

In 2016, film critics for the website IndieWire selected No Lies as one of the ten best short films ever made.

See also
 List of American films of 1973
 Found footage
 Mockumentary

Notes

Literature 
 Vivian Sobchack (1977): No Lies. Direct Cinema as Rape. In: Journal of the University Film Association 29.4 (1977): pp. 13–18.
 Mitchell Block (2006): The Truth about No Lies (If You Can Believe It). In: Juhasz, Alexandra; Lerner, Jesse (eds.) 2006: F is for Phony. Fake Documentary and Truth’s Undoing., Minneapolis: University of Minnesota Press, pp. 187–195,

External links
 
 for distribution information or to obtain a copy
 for legal viewing

1973 films
1973 short films
United States National Film Registry films
American student films
Films about rape
1970s English-language films
American short films